The West Indies cricket team toured Pakistan in October to November 1990 and played a three-match Test series against the Pakistan national cricket team. The Test series was drawn 1–1. West Indies were captained by Desmond Haynes and Pakistan by Imran Khan. In addition, the teams played a three-match Limited Overs International (LOI) series which Pakistan won 3–0.

Test series summary

1st Test

2nd Test

3rd Test

One Day Internationals (ODIs)

Pakistan won the series 3-0.

1st ODI

2nd ODI

3rd ODI

References

External links

1990 in Pakistani cricket
1990 in West Indian cricket
International cricket competitions from 1988–89 to 1991
Pakistani cricket seasons from 1970–71 to 1999–2000
1990